The Leroy P. Steele Prizes are awarded every year by the American Mathematical Society, for distinguished research work and writing in the field of mathematics. Since 1993, there has been a formal division into three categories.

The prizes have been given since 1970, from a bequest of Leroy P. Steele, and were set up in honor of George David Birkhoff, William Fogg Osgood and William Caspar Graustein. The way the prizes are awarded was changed in 1976 and 1993, but the initial aim of honoring expository writing as well as research has been retained. The prizes of $5,000 are not given on a strict national basis, but relate to mathematical activity in the USA, and writing in English (originally, or in translation).

Steele Prize for Lifetime Achievement
2023 Nicholas M. Katz
2022 Richard P. Stanley
2021 Spencer Bloch
2020 Karen Uhlenbeck
2019 Jeff Cheeger
2018 Jean Bourgain
2017 James G. Arthur
2016 Barry Simon
2015 Victor Kac
2014 Phillip A. Griffiths
2013 Yakov G. Sinai
2012 Ivo M. Babuška
2011 John W. Milnor
2010 William Fulton
2009 Luis Caffarelli
2008 George Lusztig
2007 Henry P. McKean
2006 Frederick W. Gehring, Dennis P. Sullivan
2005 Israel M. Gelfand
2004 Cathleen Synge Morawetz
2003 Ronald Graham, Victor Guillemin
2002 Michael Artin, Elias Stein
2001 Harry Kesten
2000 Isadore M. Singer
1999 Richard V. Kadison
1998 Nathan Jacobson
1997 Ralph S. Phillips
1996 Goro Shimura
1995 John T. Tate
1994 Louis Nirenberg
1993 Eugene B. Dynkin

Steele Prize for Mathematical Exposition

Steele Prize for Seminal Contribution to Research

Leroy P. Steele Prizes awarded prior to 1993
1992 Jacques Dixmier for his books von Neumann Algebras (Algèbres de von Neumann ), Gauthier-Villars, Paris (1957); C*-Algebras (Les C*-Algèbres et leurs Representations ), Gauthier-Villars, Paris (1964); and Enveloping Algebras (Algèbres Enveloppantes ), Gauthier-Villars, Paris (1974).
1992 James Glimm for his paper, Solution in the large for nonlinear hyperbolic systems of conservation laws, Communications on Pure and Applied Mathematics, XVIII (1965), pp. 697–715.
1992: Peter D. Lax for his numerous and fundamental contributions to the theory and applications of linear and nonlinear partial differential equations and functional analysis, for his leadership in the development of computational and applied mathematics, and for his extraordinary impact as a teacher.
1991: Jean-François Treves for Pseudodifferential and Fourier Integral Operators, Volumes 1 and 2 (Plenum Press, 1980).
1991 Eugenio Calabi for his fundamental work on global differential geometry, especially complex differential geometry.
1991 Armand Borel for his extensive contributions in geometry and topology, the theory of Lie groups, their lattices and representations and the theory of automorphic forms, the theory of algebraic groups and their representations and extensive organizational and educational efforts to develop and disseminate modern
1990 R. D. Richtmyer for his book Difference Methods for Initial-Value Problems (Interscience, 1st Edition 1957 and 2nd Edition, with K. Morton, 1967).
1990 Bertram Kostant for his paper, On the existence and irreducibility of certain series of representations, Lie Groups and their Representations (1975), pp. 231–329.
1990 Raoul Bott for having been instrumental in changing the face of geometry and topology, with his incisive contributions to characteristic classes, K-theory, index theory, and many other tools of modern mathematics.
1989 Daniel Gorenstein for his book Finite Simple Groups, An Introduction to their Classification (Plenum Press, 1982); and his two survey articles The Classification of Finite Simple Groups and Classifying the Finite Simple Groups, Bulletin of the American Mathematical Society, volume 1 (1979) pp. 43–199, and volume 14 (1986) pp. 1–98, respectively.
1989 Alberto Calderón for his paper Uniqueness in the Cauchy Problem for Partial Differential Equations, American Journal ofMathematics, volume 80 (1958), pp. 16–36.
1989 Irving Kaplansky for his lasting impact on mathematics, particularly mathematics in America. By his energetic example, his enthusiastic exposition, and his overall generosity, he has made striking changes in mathematics and has inspired generations of younger mathematicians.
1988 Sigurdur Helgason for his books Differential Geometry and Symmetric Spaces (Academic Press, 1962), Differential Geometry, Lie Groups, and Symmetric Spaces (Academic Press, 1978); and Groups and Geometric Analysis (Academic Press, 1984).
1988 Gian-Carlo Rota for his paper On the foundations of combinatorial theory, I. Theory of Möbius functions, Zeitschrift für Wahrscheinlichkeitstheorie und Verwandte Gebiete, volume 2 (1964), pp. 340–368.
1988 Deane Montgomery for his lasting impact on mathematics, particularly mathematics in America. He is one of the founders of the modern theory of transformation groups and is particularly known for his contributions to the solution of Hilbert's fifth problem.
1987 Martin Gardner for his many books and articles on mathematics and particularly for his column "Mathematical Games" in Scientific American.
1987 Herbert Federer and Wendell Fleming for their pioneering paper, Normal and integral currents, Annals of Mathematics, volume 72 (1960), pp. 458–520.
1987 Samuel Eilenberg for his fundamental contributions to topology and algebra, in particular for his classic papers on singular homology and his work on axiomatic homology theory which had a profound influence on the development of algebraic topology.
1986 Donald E. Knuth for his expository work, The Art of Computer Programming, 3 Volumes (1st Edition 1968, 2nd Edition 1973).
1986 Rudolf E. Kálmán for his two fundamental papers: A new approach to linear filtering and prediction problems, Journal of Basic Engineering, volume 82, (1960), pp. 35–45; and Mathematical description of linear dynamical systems, SIAM Journal on Control and Optimization, volume 1 (1963), pp. 152–192; and for his contribution to a third paper, (with R. S. Bucy) New results in linear filtering and prediction theory, Journal of Basic Engineering, volume 83D (1961), pp. 95–108.
1986 Saunders Mac Lane for his many contributions to algebra and algebraic topology, and in particular for his pioneering work in homological and categorical algebra.
1985 Michael Spivak for his five-volume set, "A Comprehensive Introduction to Differential Geometry" (second edition, Publish or Perish, 1979).
1985 Robert Steinberg for three papers on various aspects of the theory of algebraic groups: Representations of algebraic groups, Nagoya Mathematical Journal, volume 22 (1963), pp. 33–56; Regular elements of semisimple algebraic groups, Institut des Hautes Études Scientifiques, Publications Mathématiques, volume 25 (1965), pp. 49–80; and Endomorphisms of linear algebraic groups, Memoirs of the American Mathematical Society, volume 80 (1968).
1985 Hassler Whitney for his fundamental work on geometric problems, particularly in the general theory of manifolds, in the study of differentiable functions on closed sets, in geometric integration theory, and in the geometry of the tangents to a singular analytic space.
1984 Elias M. Stein for his book, Singular integrals and the differentiability properties of functions, Princeton University Press (1970).
1984 Lennart Carleson for his papers: An interpolation problem for bounded analytic functions, American Journal of Mathematics, volume 80 (1958), pp. 921–930; Interpolation by bounded analytic functions and the Corona problem, Annals of Mathematics (2), volume 76 (1962), pp. 547–559; and On convergence and growth of partial sums of Fourier series, Acta Mathematica volume 116 (1966), pp. 135–157.
1984 Joseph L. Doob for his fundamental work in establishing probability as a branch of mathematics and for his continuing profound influence on its development.
1983 Paul R. Halmos for his many graduate texts in mathematics and for his articles on how to write, talk and publish mathematics.
1983 Stephen Cole Kleene for three important papers which formed the basis for later developments in generalized recursion theory and descriptive set theory: Arithmetical predicates and function quantifiers, Transactions of the American Mathematical Society 79 (1955), pp. 312–340; On the forms of the predicates in the theory of constructive ordinals (second paper), American Journal of Mathematics 77 (1955), pp. 405–428; and Hierarchies of number-theoretic predicates, Bulletin of the American Mathematical Society 61 (1955), pp. 193–213.
1983 Shiing-Shen Chern for the cumulative influence of his total mathematical work, high level of research over a period of time, particular influence on the development of the field of differential geometry, and influence on mathematics through Ph.D. students.
1982 Lars Ahlfors for his expository work in Complex analysis (McGraw–Hill Book Company, New York, 1953), and in Lectures on quasiconformal mappings (D. Van Nostrand Co., Inc., New York, 1966) and Conformal invariants (McGraw–Hill Book Company, New York, 1973).
1982 Tsit Yuen Lam for his expository work in his book Algebraic theory of quadratic forms (1973), and four of his papers: K_0 and K_1-an introduction to algebraic K-theory (1975), Ten lectures on quadratic forms over fields (1977), Serre's conjecture (1978), and The theory of ordered fields (1980).
1982 John W. Milnor for a paper of fundamental and lasting importance, On manifolds homeomorphic to the 7-sphere, Annals of Mathematics (2) 64 (1956), pp. 399–405.
1982 Fritz John for the cumulative influence of his total mathematical work, high level of research over a period of time, particular influence on the development of a field, and influence on mathematics through Ph.D. students.
1981 Oscar Zariski for his work in algebraic geometry, especially his fundamental contributions to the algebraic foundations of this subject.
1981 Eberhard Hopf for three papers of fundamental and lasting importance: Abzweigung einer periodischen Lösung von einer stationären Lösung eines Differential systems, Berichte über die Verhandlungen der Sächsischen Akademie der Wissenschaften zu Leipzig. Mathematisch-Naturwissenschaftliche Klasse, volume 95 (1943), pp. 3–22; A mathematical example displaying features of turbulence, Communications on Applied Mathematics, volume 1 (1948), pp. 303–322; and The partial differential equation u_t + uu_x = u_{xx}, Communications on Pure and Applied Mathematics, volume 3 (1950), pp. 201–230.
1981 Nelson Dunford, Jacob T. Schwartz for their expository book, Linear operators, Part I, General theory, 1958; Part II, Spectral theory, 1963; Part III, Spectral operators, 1971, Interscience Publishers, New York.
1980 André Weil for the total effect of his work on the general course of twentieth century mathematics, especially in the many areas in which he has made fundamental contributions.
1980 Harold M. Edwards for mathematical exposition in his books Riemann's zeta function, Pure and Applied Mathematics, number 58, Academic Press, New York and London, 1974; and Fermat's last theorem, Graduate Texts in Mathematics, number 50, Springer-Verlag, New York and Berlin, 1977.
1980 Gerhard Hochschild for his significant work in homological algebra and its applications.
1979 Antoni Zygmund for his cumulative influence on the theory of Fourier series, real variables, and related areas of analysis.
1979 Robin Hartshorne for his expository research article Equivalence relations on algebraic cycles and subvarieties of small codimension, Proceedings of Symposia in Pure Mathematics, volume 29, American Mathematical Society, 1975, pp. 129–164; and his book Algebraic geometry, Springer-Verlag, Berlin and New York, 1977.
1979 Joseph J. Kohn for his fundamental paper: Harmonic integrals on strongly convex domains. I, II, Annals of Mathematics, Series 2, volume 78 (1963), pp. 112–248 and volume 79 (1964), pp. 450–472.
1979 Salomon Bochner for his cumulative influence on the fields of probability theory, Fourier analysis, several complex variables, and differential geometry.
1979 Hans Lewy for three fundamental papers: On the local character of the solutions of an atypical linear differential equation in three variables and a related theorem for regular functions of two complex variables, Annals of Mathematics, Series 2, volume 64 (1956), pp. 514–522; An example of a smooth linear partial differential equation without solution, Annals of Mathematics, Series 2, volume 66 (1957), pp. 155–158; On hulls of holomorphy, Communications on Pure and Applied Mathematics, volume 13 (1960), pp. 587–591.
1976, 1977, 1978: No awards were made.
1975 George W. Mackey for his paper, Ergodic theory and its significance for statistical mechanics and probability theory, Advances in Mathematics, volume 12 (1974), pp. 178–286.
1975 H. Blaine Lawson for his paper, Foliations, Bulletin of the American Mathematical Society, volume 80 (1974), pp. 369–418.
1975 Lipman Bers for his paper, Uniformization, moduli, and Kleinian groups, Bulletin of the London Mathematical Society, volume 4 (1972), pp. 257–300.
1975 Martin Davis for his paper, Hilbert's tenth problem is unsolvable, American Mathematical Monthly, volume 80 (1973), pp. 233–269.
1975 Joseph L. Taylor for his paper, Measure algebras, CBMS Regional Conference Series in Mathematics, Number 16, American Mathematical Society, 1972.
1972 Edward B. Curtis for his paper, Simplicial homotopy theory, Advances in Mathematics, volume 6 (1971), pp. 107–209.
1972 William J. Ellison for his paper, Waring's problem, American Mathematical Monthly, volume 78 (1971), pp. 10–36.
1972 Lawrence E. Payne for his paper, Isoperimetric inequalities and their applications, SIAM Review, volume 9 (1967), pp. 453–488.
1972 Dana S. Scott for his paper, A proof of the independence of the continuum hypothesis, Mathematical Systems Theory, volume 1 (1967), pp. 89–111.
1971 James B. Carrell for his paper, written jointly with Jean Dieudonné, Invariant theory, old and new, Advances in Mathematics, volume 4 (1970), pp. 1–80.
1971 Jean Dieudonné for his paper, Algebraic geometry, Advances in Mathematics, volume 3 (1969), pp. 223–321, and for his paper, written jointly with James B. Carrell, Invariant theory, old and new, Advances in Mathematics, volume 4 (1970), pp. 1–80.
1971 Phillip A. Griffiths for his paper, Periods of integrals on algebraic manifolds, Bulletin of the American Mathematical Society, volume 76 (1970), pp. 228–296.
1970 Solomon Lefschetz for his paper, A page of mathematical autobiography, Bulletin of the American Mathematical Society, volume 74 (1968), pp. 854–879.

See also

 List of mathematics awards
 List of awards named after people

References

External links
Leroy P. Steele Prizes on the American Mathematical Society website

Awards of the American Mathematical Society
Awards established in 1970
Lifetime achievement awards